Porges is a surname. Notable people with the surname include:

Gabriel Porges
Moses Porges, (since 1841) Moses Porges, (Edler) von Portheim (1781, Prague - 1870, Prague), Czech-Austrian industrialist, vice-burgomaster of Smichow
 Joseph Porges(Edler) von Portheim (1817, Prague - 1904, Prague), a Jewish Czech-Austrian manufacturer and art patron, son of Moses
Simon Porges (1801–1869) ∞ Charlotte Porges (1801–1869)
Heinrich Porges (1837, Prague - 1900, München), Jewish Czech-Austrian/German choirmaster, music-critic ∞ Wilhelmine Merores
 Else (Elsa) Bernstein(-Porges), née Porges) (1866, Vienna - 1949, Hamburg-Eimsbüttel)
Julius "Jules" Porgès (born Yehuda Porges; 1839, Vienna - 1921), Austria-born Paris-based financier and Randlord
Nathan Porges (1848, Prostějov, Moravia - 1924), Czech-German rabbi
Moritz Porges (1857–1909), Jewish Czech chess player
Arthur Porges (1915, Chicago, Illinois - 2006), US pulp magazine author of short stories
Paul Peter Porges (born 1927, Vienna), Jewish Austrian-American cartoonist
Jan (Filip) Klusák (né Porges) (born 1934, Prague), Jewish Czech composer, author of film
Ingo Porges (born 1938, Hamburg), German footballer (de)
Stephen Porges (born 1945, New Brunswick, New Jersey), US Professor in the University of Illinois at Chicago
Seth Porges, technology journalist, television commentator, and editor at Popular Mechanics magazine
Nenad Porges (born 1946, Zagreb, SFR Yugoslavia, (now Croatia)), Croatian politician, businessman, entrepreneur and former Minister of Economy, Labour and Entrepreneurship
József Porgesz , Jewish Hungarian architect
Waldo William Porges (1899-1976), Old Etonian and Queen's Counsel (UK), son of Gustav Porges, Quartermaster, American Expeditionary Force, WW1.

See also 
Le Porge, commune in the Gironde department, Aquitaine, south-western France
Porges families website : http://porges.net

References 

Jewish surnames